The 1938 Titleholders Championship was contested from January 13–16 at Augusta Country Club. It was the 2nd edition of the Titleholders Championship.

This event was won by Patty Berg with rounds of 78-79-77-77.

Final leaderboard

External links
Herald-Journal source
Miami News source

Titleholders Championship
Golf in Georgia (U.S. state)
Titleholders Championship
Titleholders Championship
Titleholders
Titleholders Championship
Women's sports in Georgia (U.S. state)